Arnt is a Scandinavian masculine given name, predominantly found in Norway. It is derived from either Old Norse, or German and is either a short form of other names beginning with  Arn-, meaning eagle, or a shortened form of Arnold, meaning "eagle" and "ruler." People bearing the name Arnt include:

Arnt Erik Dale (born 1960), Norwegian alpine skier
Arnt Dolven (1892–1954), Norwegian agronomist and politician
Arnt Eliassen (1915–2000), Norwegian meteorologist 
Arnt Erickson (1866–1932), Norwegian-born American businessman and politician
Arnt Førland (born 1964), Norwegian motorcycle speedway rider
Arnt Gudleik Hagen (1928–2007), Norwegian politician
Arnt Haugen (1928–1988), Norwegian accordionist and music journalist
Arnt Kortgaard (born 1957), Norwegian footballer
Arnt J. Mørland (1888–1957), Norwegian ship-owner, World War II resistance member, and politician
Arnt J. C. Mørland (1921–1994), Norwegian ship-owner
Arnt Ferdinand Moss (1880–1964), Norwegian accountant and politician
Arnt Njargel (1901–1985), Norwegian politician
Arnt O. Rhea (1852–1937), Norwegian-born American politician, businessman, and educator
Arnt Rindal (1938–2015), Norwegian diplomat
Arnt Simensen (1899–1947), Norwegian footballer
Arnt Severin Ulstrup (1862–1922), Norwegian physician and politician 
Arnt Arntsen Wang (1791–1845), Norwegian politician

References

Norwegian masculine given names
Scandinavian masculine given names